Profundiconus limpalaeri is a species of sea snail, a marine gastropod mollusk in the family Conidae, the cone snails and their allies.

Like all species within the genus Profundiconus, these cone snails are predatory and venomous. They are capable of "stinging" humans, therefore live ones should be handled carefully or not at all.

Description
The length of the shell attains 35 mm.

Distribution
This species occurs off Balut Island, South Mindanao, the Philippines.

References

 Tenorio M.J. & Monnier E. (2016). A new deep water species from the Philippines: Profundiconus limpalaeri sp. nov. (Gastropoda, Conilithidae). Xenophora Taxonomy. 12: 44–51

External links
 

limpalaeri
Gastropods described in 2016